Nkosinathi Joyi (born 1 January 1983 in Mdantsane, South Africa), is a South African professional boxer with a southpaw stance who goes by the nickname of "Mabere". Joyi is the former IBF Minimumweight world champion, he was ranked by BoxRec and The Ring Magazine as the number one boxer in the Minimumweight division. He is also the two-time and current IBO Minimumweight champion.

Professional career
Joyi, who has fought his entire career in South Africa, made his professional debut on 28 April 2002 in Queenstown. He beat Dalisizwe Komani over the six round distance to make a winning start to his career. Joyi won his first minor championship on 24 April 2004, beating Mzikayse Foslare to win the South African minimumweight title.

Minimumweight world title 

The first major fight of his career came on 26 June 2009 in East London, where he fought the Filipino boxer Florante Condes in an IBF Minimumweight title eliminator. Joyi won the fight by a wide unanimous decision with scores of: 120–107 (twice) and 119–108. In his next fight, on 26 March 2010 and also in East London, Joyi challenged for the IBF title against the Mexican Raúl García. Joyi once again gained a unanimous points decision and claimed García's title, the scores were 119–109 (twice) and 118–110. On 29 January 2011, Joyi faced former WBC Minimumweight champion, Katsunari Takayama. Joyi appeared to be in full control of the bout until the third round, when an accidental clash of heads opened a deep cut along Takayama's hairline. Since four rounds had not been completed, the bout was ruled a no-contest. Joyi then defeated Takayama via a unanimous decision in a direct rematch on 30 March 2012 in East London. He had reportedly injured his left hand in the second round of that fight. Joyi's promoter Branco Milenkovic has planned to stage a unification match. However, two of the other three champions of the four major sanctioning bodies were Japanese. Although Japan's reigning world champions have been allowed to fight in a unification match with any champion of the four major sanctioning bodies since 28 February 2011, the WBC's Kazuto Ioka and the WBA's Akira Yaegashi were due to fight in their title unification bout. So, they were unavailable until at least June 2012.

In Joyi's first fight outside of South Africa, he suffered an upset knockout loss at the hands of local fighter Mario Rodriguez (14–6–4) in Sinaloa, Mexico on 1 September 2012.

Professional boxing record

See also
List of world mini-flyweight boxing champions

References

External links

 

|-

|-

1983 births
Living people
South African male boxers
People from Mdantsane
Mini-flyweight boxers
World mini-flyweight boxing champions
International Boxing Federation champions
International Boxing Organization champions
Sportspeople from the Eastern Cape